Microloma tenuifolium, or  kannetjies, is a species of plant in the family Apocynaceae that is native to the south-western Cape, South Africa.

Description

Like other Microloma species, this is a thin climbing plant. However this species has long, slender leaves ("tenuifolium" means "slender leaves") and a swollen rootstock.

It also has distinctively shaped, waxy, brightly coloured flowers. The flower sepals are held close to the main flower's column, which is twisted. The flowers appear mostly in winter and spring.

Distribution
This species usually occurs in the southern and western coastal districts, in a predominantly winter-rainfall region, with its range mostly lying within the Western Cape Province. It also extends into the westernmost part of the Eastern Cape Province.

References

External links
 
 

tenuifolium